Future Signal are a drum and bass group from London, England. Composed of Tom Parkin, Mike Quick and James Gorely they have been releasing their music since 2006. They have celebrated releases on Subtitles, Freak Recordings, Habit and Disturbed Recordings.

Discography
 Ride Of Your Life - Load Media - 2006
 Narcolepsy - AT recordings - 2007
 Assassin - AT recordings - 2008
 Death Mask - Obscene recordings - 2008
 Grime House - Obscene recordings - 2008
 Existence - Close 2 Death recordings - 2008
 Kill Switch - Close 2 Death recordings - 2008
 Last Breath - Freak mp3 exclusive - 2008
 Time Vortex - AT Recordings - 2008
 Transmission - Close 2 Death recordings mp3 - 2008
 Into The Sun - Habit recordings - 2008
 Quality Control - Habit recordings - 2008
 Mirror Image - Disturbed recordings - 2009
 Cut Off - Disturbed recordings - 2009
 Stick With The Herd - Contaminated - 2009
 Victim - Contaminated - 2009

Collaborations/Remixes
       
 Audio & Future Signal - Furyen - Subtitles recordings - 2009
 Audio No Soul (Future Signal Remix) - Habit recordings mp3 - 2007
 Insecticide - Proktah & Future Signal - 2009

External links
rolldabeat.com
SoundCloud
Facebook

British drum and bass music groups
Musical groups from London